William Henry Curry is an American conductor and composer. Since 2009 he has been the Music Director of Durham Symphony Orchestra. He has conducted more than 40 orchestras . He was born in Pittsburgh and started conducting and composing at the age of 14.

Biography

Professional career
William Curry has conducted, inter alia, Indianapolis Symphony, Baltimore Symphony, NC Symphony and the St. Paul Chamber Orchestra. 
He has won the Stokowski award for conductors. In 2019, he collaborated with Composer Rajan Somasundaram for the classical Tamil poetry, Yathum Oore (Circa 200B.C.), the theme song of 10th World Tamil Conference.

References

American male conductors (music)
Aspen Music Festival and School alumni
Living people
21st-century American conductors (music)
21st-century American male musicians
Year of birth missing (living people)